Reginald Charles Stuart (September 1, 1943 – April 29, 2018) was a Canadian historian. The main focus of his work is on two major topics: the American experience with war as an instrument of policy and the relations of Canadians and Americans in what he terms Upper North America. He retired in 2013 and lived in Halifax, Nova Scotia.

Career 
Reginald C. Stuart was born on September 1, 1943 in Vancouver, British Columbia. He received his B.A. and M.A. at the University of British Columbia, and his PhD. at the University of Florida. He taught at Prince of Wales College from 1968–1969 and at the University of Prince Edward Island from 1969–1988. He came to Mount Saint Vincent University in Halifax as Dean of Arts and Science in 1988 and became a full-time faculty member in 1996.

Awards 
 Reginald C. Stuart won twice Merit Award for Scholarly Achievement at the University of Prince Edward Island (1982-1983) and (1987-1988).
 His United States Expansionism and British North America (1988) won the 1990 The Albert Corey Prize. This book is also one of the references to War of 1812.
 He won the MSVU Award for Research Excellence (2004).
 He won a Canadian-American Fulbright award in 2003 and became the distinguished Chair in North American Studies at the Woodrow Wilson International Center for Scholars in Washington D.C. from January to June,  2004.

Selected publications
Transnationalism in Canada-United States History  Montreal: McGill-Queen's University Press, 2010. Co-editor with Michael D. Behiels.
Civil-Military Relations during the War of 1812. Westport, CT: Praeger, 2009. This book is listed as one of the references to Vermont National Guard.
Dispersed Relations: Americans and Canadians in Upper North America. Washington, DC: Co-published by Woodrow Wilson Center Press; and Baltimore, MD: Johns Hopkins University Press, 2007.
 Too Close? Too Far? Just Right? False Dichotomies and Canada-US Policy Making. Orono, Maine: Canadian-American Center, No. 66, April 2006.
 United States Expansionism and British North America, 1775-1871. Chapel Hill: the University of North Carolina Press, 1988. This book is also listed in the references to Manifest destiny.
The First Seventy-Five Years. Vancouver: the Certified General Accountants Association of Canada, 1988.
War and American Thought: From the Revolution to the Monroe Doctrine. Kent, Ohio: the Kent State University Press, 1982.
The Half-way Pacifist: Thomas Jefferson's View of War. Toronto: University of Toronto Press, 1978.

Both Transnationalism in Canada-United States History and Dispersed Relations: Americans and Canadians in Upper North America are listed in the Further Reading to Canada–United States relations.

Dr. Stuart's articles and reviews have appeared in The American Review of Canadian Studies, Diplomatic History, Canadian Journal of History, International History Review, Canadian Review of American Studies, the Journal of Church and State, Canadian Review of Studies in Nationalism, and the Tennessee Historical Quarterly. He contributed a chapter, "A Thousand Points of Partnership: Upper North America to 1931," in the book,Forgotten Partnership Redux: Canada-U.S. Relations in the 21st Century. Amherst, NY: Cambria Press, 2011, PP. 305–340. His article "Prologue to Manifest Destiny: Anglo-American Relations in the 1840s" is in the references to Louis McLane.

References

External links
 The Mount website

1943 births
2018 deaths
20th-century Canadian historians
Historians of Atlantic Canada
Writers from Halifax, Nova Scotia
Writers from Vancouver
Academic staff of Mount Saint Vincent University
University of Florida alumni
University of British Columbia alumni
Academic staff of the University of Prince Edward Island
21st-century Canadian historians